Charles Roy Billington (8 November 1927 – 19 November 1985) was an English professional footballer who made 249 appearances in the Football League playing as a defender for Aldershot (226 appearances in all competitions), Norwich City, Watford and Mansfield Town. He was on the books of hometown club Chesterfield as an amateur, but never played for their first team, and played non-league football for Parkhouse Colliery and Burton Albion.

References

1927 births
1985 deaths
Footballers from Chesterfield
English footballers
Association football defenders
Chesterfield F.C. players
Aldershot F.C. players
Norwich City F.C. players
Watford F.C. players
Mansfield Town F.C. players
Burton Albion F.C. players
English Football League players